Brook Chapel is a historic chapel located at Hillburn in Rockland County, New York, USA. It was built in 1893 and is a light frame "L" shaped, gable roofed structure expanded to its current size in the first half of the 20th century. At the time of the expansion, it acquired its Gothic Revival style.

It was listed on the National Register of Historic Places in 2010.

References

Properties of religious function on the National Register of Historic Places in New York (state)
Churches completed in 1893
19th-century churches in the United States
Churches in Rockland County, New York
Ramapos
National Register of Historic Places in Rockland County, New York